Vona is a Statutory Town in Kit Carson County, Colorado, United States.  The population was 103 at the 2018 census.

History
Vona was named after Vona, the niece of an attorney from Burlington by the name of Pearl S. King.

Geography

Demographics

As of the census of 2000, there were 95 people, 44 households, and 28 families residing in the town. The racial makeup of the town was 90.53% White, 8.42% from other races, and 1.05% from two or more races. Hispanic or Latino of any race were 9.47% of the population.

There were 44 households, out of which 25.0% had children under the age of 18 living with them, 63.6% were married couples living together, and 34.1% were non-families. 34.1% of all households were made up of individuals, and 22.7% had someone living alone who was 65 years of age or older. The average household size was 2.16 and the average family size was 2.76.

In the town, the population was spread out, with 24.2% under the age of 18, 1.1% from 18 to 24, 23.2% from 25 to 44, 30.5% from 45 to 64, and 21.1% who were 65 years of age or older. The median age was 48 years. For every 100 females, there were 90.0 males. For every 100 females age 18 and over, there were 75.6 males.

The median income for a household in the town was $32,250, and the median income for a family was $41,000. Males had a median income of $25,000 versus $18,125 for females. The per capita income for the town was $37,802. There were no families and 8.5% of the population living below the poverty line, including no under eighteens and 9.4% of those over 64.

Transportation
Interstate 70 passes just south of Vona. The Vona exit from I-70 is exit 412. A service road runs just north of the interstate, from Seibert through Vona, Stratton and Bethune to Burlington.

See also

 List of municipalities in Colorado

References

External links

 CDOT map of the Town of Vona

Towns in Kit Carson County, Colorado
Towns in Colorado